Kroksjö is a small town in Umeå Municipality, Sweden.  The resort is located along County Road 364 on Lake Kroksjön, about 3 km north of Umeå.

Populated places in Umeå Municipality